is a Japanese international rugby union player who plays as a scrum-half.

Club career

Ogawa has played all of his senior club rugby in Japan with the Toshiba Brave Lupus who he joined in 2013.   He is the regular goalkicker for his side and has amassed over 350 career points.

International

Ogawa was a Japan Sevens representative during the 2013–14 IRB Sevens World Series playing in 2 events. He received his first call-up to Japan's senior squad ahead of the 2016 end-of-year rugby union internationals.

References

1991 births
Living people
Japanese rugby union players
Japan international rugby union players
Japanese rugby sevens players
Rugby union scrum-halves
Toshiba Brave Lupus Tokyo players
Nihon University alumni
Sportspeople from Fukuoka Prefecture
Sunwolves players